Ann-Christine Nyström-Silén (26 July 1944 – 5 October 2022), also known by her stage name Ann-Christine, was a Finnish singer who performed in the Eurovision Song Contest 1966 for Finland with the song "Playboy".

Nyström chose to end her musical career in 1973 after 11 years in show business, and moved to Stockholm, Sweden, in 1976, where she lived until her death.

Nyström died in Stockholm on 5 October 2022, at the age of 78.

References

External links
 
 

1944 births
2022 deaths
20th-century Finnish women singers
Eurovision Song Contest entrants for Finland
Eurovision Song Contest entrants of 1966
Finnish expatriates in Sweden
Singers from Helsinki
Swedish-speaking Finns